Brent Werner (born April 15, 1974) is an American motorcycle speedway rider who was a member of United States team at Speedway World Cups.

Career details 
 Individual World Championship
 1994 – 12th place in American Final
 Team World Championship (Speedway World Team Cup and Speedway World Cup)
 2000 -  Coventry – 3rd place (0 pts)
 2001 -  Wrocław – 5th place (2 pts)
 2002 – 6th place
 2006 – 6th place
 U.S. Junior National Championship
 1988 – US Champion
 1989 – US Champion

See also 
 United States national speedway team
 Speedway World Cup

References 

1974 births
American speedway riders
Living people
Oxford Cheetahs riders